(also written with the  characters《》), was also called , , , , and ,  is a type of  (upper garment) for women in , the Korean traditional clothing, which was worn for ceremonial occasions (e.g. for minor ceremonies in the palace as soryebok (小禮服)) in the palace during the Joseon dynasty. It was typically a garment item reserved for the upper class and commoners of this period would rarely see anyone in this garment. It was worn as a simple official outfit or for small national ceremonies while court ladies wore it as a daily garment.

Origins 
It is currently believed the Dangui originated from jangjeogori (장저고리; long jeogori), which was worn before the early Joseon Dynasty as formal wear.

The scholars of the late Joseon Dynasty, such as Bak Gyusu who wrote the Geoga japbokgo (거가잡복고 居家雜服攷), a history of Korean clothing, in 1841, believed that the Dangui originated from China and may have dated back to the time when the Chinese clothing system was introduced to Korea between 57 BC and 668 AD, during the Three Kingdoms period of Korea: 

This belief was due to the use of the Chinese character《》; this character could either refer to the Tang (唐) dynasty or indicate a "Chinese" (唐) product introduced from China; but, in this context, the scholars had assumed that it referred to the Tang dynasty. However, the claim that the dangui dates back to the Tang dynasty is currently judged as being erroneous, considering that the clothing characteristics of Dangui appeared in the middle of the 17th century according to the excavation of related relics. It is also noted that it is only in the 17th century that the term dangui first appeared in literature.  

Whether the late Joseon theory on the origins of the dangui is probable or not, it is certain that  was worn during the Joseon period, based on historical documents and remains. The scholar, Yi Jae (李縡 1680 ~ 1746) mentioned  in his book,  《》which defines four important rites based on Confucianism. It is also a woman's , a daily garments when working.

Construction and design 

The side seams are open to the armpit and are curved in shape.

The white border band is an indication that it is a type of ceremonial garment.

Lining and padding 

As the Queen had worn a white  made of a single fabric the day before the Dano festival, which falls on the 5th day of the fifth month of the lunar calendar, every women at court followed the trend and change their clothing to the single layered one the next day. Likewise, when the Queen began to wear a double layered  the day before Chuseok, an event which celebrates on every 15th day of August in the lunar calendar, all women in the palace changed their clothing to the double layered  the next day.

Colours and decorations

Colours 
The queen consort, the king's concubines,  (court matron), and  women (nobility) wore the garment over a short jacket called . According to colour, there were yellowish green, pale green, purple, navy, dark blue, and white-colored  and others, but yellowish green coloured one was the most commonly worn  during the time. The dangui were also named after their colours, for example,  yeondu dangui for green, jaju dangui for plum, namsong dangui for blue, and baesaek dangui for white. Each colour also has its own unique association with the seasons: purple were used for the winter solstice, pale green was for spring, and white was for the Dano, in the summer after the Dano, or were used as mourning attire for a state funeral. The purple  was used by the queen in winter. The dark blue  appears to have been used by low-ranking court ladies, who wore it on important events, such as royal wedding.

Decorations 

In the  patterns, illustrations of flower or bats or  characters which symbolizes auspicious themes, such as 《壽》which uses the Chinese character 《》and expresses wishes for longevity; 《福》which uses the Chinese character 《》which expresses wishes for good fortune; and 《》which uses the Chinese character 《》, commonly known as double happiness in English, which expresses wishes for a blessed marriage. For the Queen, patterns depicting the phoenix were also used. Official rank badge called  or the royal badge called  could also be sewn on the chest area of the  according to its wearer ranks.

Wedding dress 
Since it was easy to wear and neat, the  eventually became one of commonly worn wedding clothing among commoners during the Joseon dynasty.

Gallery

See also
Jeogori
Po
Wonsam
Hwarot

References

Korean clothing
Folk costumes